Thongchai Tor.Silachai (ธงชัย ต.ศิลาชัย) is a retired Thai Muay Thai fighter. He is a former four-time Lumpinee Stadium champion and is the only fighter to have ever knocked out Muay Thai legend Saenchai.

Biography 
Thongchai was born in Chakkarat, Nakhon Ratchasima. He started boxing at the age of 10.

He trained at the famous Tor.Silachai gym for his entire career, under the great Medprik Tor.Silachai, a former Lumpinee Stadium Champion in the 1960s, and owner of the camp.

Thongchai fought under legendary promoter Songchai Rattanasuban's OneSongchai promotion for his entire stadium career, totaling well over 20 years. At the peak of his career, he had a purse of ฿180,000 baht.

In 1998, he received his first Fighter of the Year award from the Sports Authority of Thailand. In 2001, Thongchai had gone 10-2, with notable wins over Bovy Sor.Udomson, Pornsanae Sitmonchai, Klairung Sor.Sasiprapa, and Sayannoi Kiatprapat. As such, Thongchai won both the Sports Authority and Sports Writers Association of Thailand Fighter of the Year award. He was 30 years old when he received this award, making him the oldest recipient in the award's history.

Throughout the course of his long career, he has fought many great champions such as Saenchai, Anuwat Kaewsamrit, Samson Isaan, Amnat Ruenroeng, Bovy Sor.Udomson, Pornsanae Sitmonchai, Kaolan Kaovichit, Namsaknoi Yudthagarngamtorn, Panomrunglek Kiatmuu9, Orono Wor.Petchpun, Pakorn Sakyothin, Nungubon Sitlerchai, Wuttidet Lukprabat, Therdkiat Sitthepitak, Wanmeechai Menayothin, Pairojnoi Sor.Siamchai, Tukatatong Por.Pongsawang, Toto Por.Pongsawang, Rattanachai Wor.Warapon, Kompayak Singmanee, Duwao Aborigin, Puja Sor.Suwanee, Nuengsiam Fairtex, and more.

Titles and accomplishments
Muay Thai
Lumpinee Stadium
 1990 Lumpinee Stadium 105 lbs Champion
 1991 Lumpinee Stadium 108 lbs Champion
 1993 Lumpinee Stadium 112 lbs Champion (defended twice)
 1997 Lumpinee Stadium 115 lbs Champion
Rajadamnern Stadium
 2001 Rajadamnern Stadium 115 lbs Champion (defended once)World Muay Thai Council 2001 WMC World 115 lbs Champion (defended once)Other 2007 Mitsubishi Triton Tournament WinnerAccomplishments 1998 Sports Authority of Thailand Fighter of the Year
 2001 Sports Authority of Thailand Fighter of the Year
 2001 Sports Writers Association of Thailand Fighter of the Year

Fight record

|-  style="background:#fbb;"
| 2009-09-10|| Loss ||align=left| Kaimukkao Por.Thairongruangkamai || Rajadamnern Stadium || Bangkok, Thailand || Decision || 5 || 3:00
|- style="background:#fbb;"
|2009-08-06||Loss|| align=left| Luknimit Singklongsi|| Rajadamnern Stadium || Bangkok, Thailand || TKO (Cut) || 4 ||
|-  style="background:#fbb;"
| 2009-07-03|| Loss||align=left| Kangwanlek Petchyindee || Lumpinee Stadium || Bangkok, Thailand || Decision || 5 || 3:00
|-  style="background:#fbb;"
| 2008-11-27 || Loss ||align=left| Pakorn P.K.Saenchaimuaythaigym || Rajadamnern Stadium || Bangkok, Thailand || Decision || 5 || 3:00
|-  style="background:#cfc;"
| 2008-11-06|| Win ||align=left| Kaimukkao Por.Thairongruangkamai || Rajadamnern Stadium || Bangkok, Thailand || Decision || 5 || 3:00
|- style="background:#fbb;"
| 2008-04-10|| Loss || align=left| Luknimit Singklongsi || Rajadamnern Stadium || Bangkok, Thailand || Decision || 5 ||3:00
|- style="background:#cfc;"
| 2008-02-07|| Win || align=left| Detsuriya Sittiprasert || Rajadamnern Stadium || Bangkok, Thailand || Decision || 5 ||3:00
|- style="background:#cfc;"
| 2007-10-30|| Win || align=left| Luknimit Singklongsi || Rajadamnern Stadium || Bangkok, Thailand || Decision || 5 ||3:00
|- style="background:#cfc;"
| 2007-08-30|| Win || align=left| Thaweesak Singklongsi || Rajadamnern Stadium || Bangkok, Thailand || Decision || 5 ||3:00
|- style="background:#fbb;"
| 2007-06-25|| Loss || align=left| Rittijak Kaewsamrit || Rajadamnern Stadium || Bangkok, Thailand || Decision || 5 ||3:00
|- style="background:#cfc;"
| 2007 || Win || align=left| Rittijak Kaewsamrit || Rajadamnern Stadium || Bangkok, Thailand || Decision || 5 ||3:00
|-
! style=background:white colspan=9 |
|- style="background:#cfc;"
| 2007-03-08|| Win || align=left| Manasak Narupai || Rajadamnern Stadium || Bangkok, Thailand || Decision || 5 ||3:00
|- style="background:#cfc;"
| 2006-10-28|| Win || align=left| Payakseua Gardenseaview || Bangkok Boxing Stadium || Bangkok, Thailand || Decision || 5 ||3:00
|- style="background:#fbb;"
| 2006-09-25|| Loss || align=left| Payakseua Gardenseaview || Rajadamnern Stadium || Bangkok, Thailand || Decision || 5 ||3:00
|-  style="background:#fbb;"
| 2006-08-14 || Loss ||align=left| Chatchainoi Sitbenjema || Rajadamnern Stadium || Bangkok, Thailand || TKO || 4 ||
|-  style="background:#cfc;"
| 2006-07-05 || Win ||align=left| Detnarong Sitjaboon || Rajadamnern Stadium || Bangkok, Thailand || Decision || 5 || 3:00
|-  style="background:#cfc;"
| 2006-03-06 || Win ||align=left| Ponmongkhol Sakhiranchai || Rajadamnern Stadium || Bangkok, Thailand || TKO || 4 ||
|-  style="background:#fbb;"
| 2006-01-30 || Loss ||align=left| Phandin Sor.Dumrongrit || Rajadamnern Stadium || Bangkok, Thailand || Decision || 5 || 3:00
|-  style="background:#fbb;"
| 2005-12-22 || Loss ||align=left| Daoden Singklongsi || Rajadamnern Stadium || Bangkok, Thailand || Decision || 5 || 3:00

|-  style="background:#fbb;"
| 2005-10-06 || Loss||align=left| Rungruanglek Lukprabat || Rajadamnern Stadium || Bangkok, Thailand || Decision || 5 || 3:00

|-  style="background:#fbb;"
| 2005-09-15 || Loss ||align=left| Pornsanae Sitmonchai || Rajadamnern Stadium || Bangkok, Thailand || Decision || 5 || 3:00
|-  style="background:#fbb;"
| 2005-08-12 || Loss ||align=left| Anuwat Kaewsamrit || Queens Birthday Superfights, Sanam Luang || Bangkok, Thailand || Decision (Unanimous) || 5 || 3:00
|-  style="background:#cfc;"
| 2005-06-22 || Win ||align=left| Tubnar Sitromsai || Rajadamnern Stadium || Bangkok, Thailand || Decision || 5 || 3:00
|-  style="background:#fbb;"
| 2005-03-14 || Loss ||align=left| Phetek Kiatyongyut || Rajadamnern Stadium || Bangkok, Thailand || Decision || 5 || 3:00
|-  style="background:#cfc;"
| 2005-02-14 || Win ||align=left| Seuahuanlek Kor.Sopipong || Rajadamnern Stadium || Bangkok, Thailand || Decision || 5 || 3:00
|-  style="background:#cfc;"
| 2005-01-05 || Win ||align=left| Phetmanee Phetsupaphan || Rajadamnern Stadium || Bangkok, Thailand || Decision || 5 || 3:00
|-  style="background:#cfc;"
| 2004-12-06 || Win ||align=left| Orono Muangseema || Rajadamnern Stadium || Bangkok, Thailand || TKO || 2 ||
|-  style="background:#cfc;"
| 2004-11-11 || Win ||align=left| Pornsanae Sitmonchai || Rajadamnern Stadium || Bangkok, Thailand || Decision || 5 || 3:00
|-  style="background:#cfc;"
| 2004-10-14 || Win ||align=left| Tubnar Sitromsai || Rajadamnern Stadium || Bangkok, Thailand || Decision || 5 || 3:00
|-  style="background:#fbb;"
| 2004-09-02 || Loss ||align=left| Dennaklang Sor.Weerapan || Rajadamnern Stadium || Bangkok, Thailand || Decision || 5 || 3:00
|-  style="background:#fbb;"
| 2004-07-18 || Loss ||align=left| Panomrunglek Kiatmuu9 || || Thailand || Decision || 5 || 3:00
|-  style="background:#cfc;"
| 2004-06-03 || Win ||align=left| Kwanpichit 13Coinsexpress || Rajadamnern Stadium || Bangkok, Thailand || KO || 3 ||
|-  style="background:#cfc;"
| 2004-04-08 || Win ||align=left| Payakseua Sor.Hengjaroen || Rajadamnern Stadium || Bangkok, Thailand || Decision || 5 || 3:00
|-  style="background:#fbb;"
| 2004-02-18 || Loss ||align=left| Kwanpichit 13Coinsexpress || Rajadamnern Stadium || Bangkok, Thailand || Decision || 5 || 3:00
|-  style="background:#fbb;"
| 2003-11-27 || Loss ||align=left| Chatchainoi Sitbenjema || Rajadamnern Stadium || Bangkok, Thailand || Decision || 5 || 3:00
|-
! style=background:white colspan=9 |
|-  style="background:#cfc;"
| 2003-09-28 || Win ||align=left| Orono Muangsima|| Rajadamnern Stadium || Bangkok, Thailand || Decision || 5 || 3:00
|-  style="background:#fbb;"
| 2003-08-17 || Loss ||align=left| Orono Sor.Sakulpan|| Rajadamnern Stadium || Bangkok, Thailand || Decision || 5 || 3:00
|-  style="background:#c5d2ea;"
| 2003-06-23 || Draw ||align=left| Tongsing Kiatchansing || Rajadamnern Stadium || Bangkok, Thailand || Decision || 5 || 3:00
|-  style="background:#cfc;"
| 2003 || Win ||align=left| Wanmeechai Menayothin || Rajadamnern Stadium || Bangkok, Thailand || Decision || 5 || 3:00
|-  style="background:#fbb;"
| 2002-10-09 || Loss ||align=left| Paruehatnoi Sitjami || Rajadamnern Stadium || Bangkok, Thailand || Decision || 5 || 3:00
|-  style="background:#;"
| 2002-09-09 ||  ||align=left| Wuttidet Lukprabat || Rajadamnern Stadium || Bangkok, Thailand || Decision || 5 || 3:00
|-  style="background:#fbb;"
| 2002-08-07 || Loss ||align=left| Ronachai Naratrikun || Rajadamnern Stadium || Bangkok, Thailand || Decision || 5 || 3:00
|-  style="background:#fbb;"
| 2002-07-24 || Loss ||align=left| Orono Sor.Sakulpan|| Rajadamnern Stadium || Bangkok, Thailand || Decision || 5 || 3:00
|-  style="background:#cfc;"
| 2002-04-13 || Win ||align=left| Sayannoi Kiatprapat || || Nakhon Ratchasima, Thailand || Decision || 5 || 3:00

|-  style="background:#fbb;"
| 2002- || Loss||align=left| Klairung SasiprapaGym || Rajadamnern Stadium || Bangkok, Thailand || Decision || 5 || 3:00

|-  style="background:#cfc;"
| 2002-01-14 || Win ||align=left| Puja Sor.Suwanee || Rajadamnern Stadium || Bangkok, Thailand || Decision || 5 || 3:00
|-  style="background:#cfc;"
| 2001-12-19 || Win ||align=left| Sayannoi Kiatprapat || Rajadamnern Stadium || Bangkok, Thailand || Decision || 5 || 3:00

|-  style="background:#fbb;"
| 2001-11-07 || Loss ||align=left| Sayannoi Kiatprapat || Rajadamnern Stadium || Bangkok, Thailand || Decision || 5 || 3:00
|-
! style=background:white colspan=9 |
|-  style="background:#cfc;"
| 2001-10- || Win ||align=left| Pornsanae Sitmonchai || Rajadamnern Stadium || Bangkok, Thailand || Decision || 5 || 3:00
|-  style="background:#cfc;"
| 2001- || Win ||align=left| Sayannoi Kiatprapat || || Nakhon Ratchasima, Thailand || Decision || 5 || 3:00
|-
! style=background:white colspan=9 |

|-  style="background:#cfc;"
| 2001 || Win ||align=left| Michael Sor.Sakulpan || Rajadamnern Stadium || Bangkok, Thailand || Decision || 5 || 3:00

|-  style="background:#cfc;"
| 2001-09-05 || Win ||align=left| Bovy Sor.Udomson|| Rajadamnern Stadium || Bangkok, Thailand || Decision || 5 || 3:00
|-  style="background:#cfc;"
| 2001- || Win ||align=left| Namkabuanlek Nongkeepahuyuth || Rajadamnern Stadium || Bangkok, Thailand || Decision || 5 || 3:00
|-  style="background:#cfc;"
| 2001-07-12 || Win ||align=left| Bovy Sor.Udomson|| Rajadamnern Stadium || Bangkok, Thailand || Decision || 5 || 3:00
|-  style="background:#cfc;"
| 2001-05-31 || Win ||align=left| Sayannoi Kiatprapat || Rajadamnern Stadium || Bangkok, Thailand || Decision || 5 || 3:00
|-
! style=background:white colspan=9 |

|-  style="background:#fbb;"
| 2001-04-25 || Loss ||align=left| Petchtho Sitjaopho || Rajadamnern Stadium || Bangkok, Thailand || Decision || 5 || 3:00
|-  style="background:#cfc;"
| 2001-03-22 || Win ||align=left| Puja Sor.Suwanee || Rajadamnern Stadium || Bangkok, Thailand || Decision || 5 || 3:00
|-  style="background:#cfc;"
| 2001-02-22 || Win ||align=left| Klairung Sor.Sasiprapa || Rajadamnern Stadium || Bangkok, Thailand || TKO || 4 ||
|-
! style=background:white colspan=9 |
|-  style="background:#cfc;"
| 2001 || Win ||align=left| Rungrit Sitchamlong || Lumpinee Stadium || Bangkok, Thailand || Decision || 5 || 3:00
|-  style="background:#fbb;"
| 2000-10-06 || Loss ||align=left| Yodpradab Daopadriew || Lumpinee Stadium || Bangkok, Thailand || Decision || 5 || 3:00
|-  style="background:#cfc;"
| 2000-06-02 || Win ||align=left| Wanpichai Sor.Khamsing || Lumpinee Stadium || Bangkok, Thailand || Decision || 5 || 3:00
|-  style="background:#fbb;"
| 2000-03-03 || Loss ||align=left| Paruehatnoi Sitjami || Lumpinee Stadium || Bangkok, Thailand || Decision || 5 || 3:00
|-
! style=background:white colspan=9 |
|-  style="background:#cfc;"
| 2000-01-25 || Win ||align=left| Petch Por.Burapa || Lumpinee Stadium || Bangkok, Thailand || Decision || 5 || 3:00
|-  style="background:#cfc;"
| 1999-12-07 || Win ||align=left| Michael Sor.Sakulphan || Lumpinee Stadium || Bangkok, Thailand || Decision || 5 || 3:00
|-  style="background:#fbb;"
| 1999-11-05 || Loss||align=left| Nongbee Kiatyongyut || Lumpinee Stadium || Bangkok, Thailand || Decision || 5 || 3:00

|-  style="background:#fbb;"
| 1999- || Loss ||align=left| Michael Sor.Sakulphan || Lumpinee Stadium || Bangkok, Thailand || Decision || 5 || 3:00
|-  style="background:#cfc;"
| 1999-02-05 || Win ||align=left| Chalamkhao Kiatpantong || Lumpinee Stadium || Bangkok, Thailand || TKO (broken jaw) || 2 ||
|-  style="background:#fbb;"
| 1999-01-12 || Loss ||align=left| Saenchai Sor.Khamsing || Lumpinee Stadium || Bangkok, Thailand || Decision || 5 || 3:00

|-  style="background:#cfc;"
| 1998-10-26 || Win ||align=left| Sakpaitoon Dejrat || Rajadamnern Stadium || Bangkok, Thailand || Decision || 5 || 3:00

|-  style="background:#cfc;"
| 1998-09-12 || Win ||align=left| Saenchai Sor.Khamsing || Lumpinee Stadium || Bangkok, Thailand || Decision || 5 || 3:00
|-  style="background:#cfc;"
| 1998-03-02 || Win ||align=left| Duwao Aborigin || Rajadamnern Stadium || Bangkok, Thailand || Decision || 5 || 3:00
|-  style="background:#cfc;"
| 1997-12-16 || Win ||align=left| Chaichana Dejtawee || Lumpinee Stadium || Bangkok, Thailand || Decision || 5 || 3:00
|-  style="background:#fbb;"
| 1997 || Loss ||align=left| Namsaknoi Yudthagarngamtorn|| Lumpinee Stadium || Bangkok, Thailand || Decision || 5 || 3:00
|-  style="background:#fbb;"
| 1997-09-05 || Loss ||align=left| Densiam Lukprabat || Lumpinee Stadium || Bangkok, Thailand || Decision || 5 || 3:00
|-  style="background:#cfc;"
| 1997-07-29 || Win||align=left| Telek Por.Yosanan || Lumpinee Stadium || Bangkok, Thailand || KO||1 ||
|-
! style=background:white colspan=9 |

|-  style="background:#cfc;"
| 1997-06-06 || Win ||align=left| Ekkachai Tor.Chaibadan || Lumpinee Stadium || Bangkok, Thailand || KO (right uppercut) || 3 ||
|-  style="background:#fbb;"
| 1997-05-09 || Loss ||align=left| Teelek Por.Samranchai || Lumpinee Stadium || Bangkok, Thailand || Decision || 5 || 3:00

|-  style="background:#fbb;"
| 1997- || Loss ||align=left| Wanghin Kiatwichian || Lumpinee Stadium || Bangkok, Thailand || Decision || 5 || 3:00

|-  style="background:#cfc;"
| 1997- || Win ||align=left| Kotchasarn Singklongksi || Lumpinee Stadium || Bangkok, Thailand || KO || ||

|-  style="background:#cfc;"
| 1997-01-30 || Win ||align=left| Wanghin Mor.Prasathinpeemai || Lumpinee Stadium || Bangkok, Thailand || Decision || 5 || 3:00
|-  style="background:#cfc;"
| 1996-11-12 || Won ||align=left| Rattanachai Wor.Walapon || Lumpinee Stadium || Bangkok, Thailand || Decision || 5 || 3:00
|-  style="background:#fbb;"
| 1996-10-22 || Loss ||align=left| Nuengsiam Fairtex || Lumpinee Stadium || Bangkok, Thailand || Decision || 5 || 3:00
|-  style="background:#fbb;"
| 1996-09-24 || Loss ||align=left| Kaolan Kaovichit || Lumpinee Stadium || Bangkok, Thailand || Decision || 5 || 3:00

|-  style="background:#cfc;"
| 1996- || Win ||align=left| Saenchai Sor.Khamsing || Lumpinee Stadium || Bangkok, Thailand || KO (Right Hook) || || 2:33

|-  style="background:#c5d2ea;"
| 1996-05-21 || No Contest ||align=left| Pudpadlek Sor.Chalermchai || Lumpinee Stadium || Bangkok, Thailand || Referee stoppage || 3 ||

|-  style="background:#fbb;"
| 1996-03-26 || Loss ||align=left| Nongnarong Luksamrong || Lumpinee Stadium || Bangkok, Thailand || Decision || 5 || 3:00
|-
! style=background:white colspan=9 |

|-  style="background:#cfc;"
| 1996-02-13 || Win ||align=left| Tukatatong Por.Pongsawang || Lumpinee Stadium || Bangkok, Thailand || KO  || 4 || 

|-  style="background:#cfc;"
| 1995-10-17 || Win ||align=left| Tukatatong Por.Pongsawang || Lumpinee Stadium || Bangkok, Thailand || Decision || 5 || 3:00

|-  style="background:#cfc;"
| 1995-08-25 || Win ||align=left| Chaiyai Sitkaruhat || Lumpinee Stadium || Bangkok, Thailand || Decision || 5 || 3:00

|-  style="background:#cfc;"
| 1995-08-04 || Win ||align=left| Nongnarong Luksamrong || Lumpinee Stadium || Bangkok, Thailand || Decision || 5 || 3:00

|-  style="background:#fbb;"
| 1995-05-23 || Loss ||align=left| Sittichai Phetbangprang || Lumpinee Stadium || Bangkok, Thailand || Decision || 5 || 3:00
|-
! style=background:white colspan=9 |

|-  style="background:#fbb;"
| 1995-01-03 || Loss ||align=left| Nungubon Sitlerchai || Lumpinee Stadium || Bangkok, Thailand || Decision || 5 || 3:00
|-  style="background:#c5d2ea;"
| 1994-11-18 || Draw ||align=left| Huatapan Sor.Sumalee || Lumpinee Stadium || Bangkok, Thailand || Decision || 5 || 3:00

|-  style="background:#cfc;"
| 1994- || Win ||align=left| Netnarin Fairtex || Lumpinee Stadium || Bangkok, Thailand || KO||  || 
|-
! style=background:white colspan=9 |

|-  style="background:#cfc;"
| 1994-04-22 || Win ||align=left| Singhao Tor.Hiamto || Lumpinee Stadium || Bangkok, Thailand || Decision || 5 || 3:00
|-  style="background:#fbb;"
| 1994-02-11 || Loss ||align=left| Nongnarong Luksamrong || Lumpinee Stadium || Bangkok, Thailand || Decision || 5 || 3:00
|-  style="background:#fbb;"
| 1994- || Loss ||align=left| Meechok Sor.Ploenchit || Lumpinee Stadium || Bangkok, Thailand || Decision || 5 || 3:00
|-  style="background:#cfc;"
| 1993-11-30 || Win ||align=left| Rittidet Sor.Ploenjit || Lumpinee Stadium || Bangkok, Thailand || Decision || 5 || 3:00
|-
! style=background:white colspan=9 |
|-  style="background:#cfc;"
| 1993-10-22 || Win ||align=left| Wangthong Por.Pisitchet || Lumpinee Stadium || Bangkok, Thailand || Decision || 5 ||3:00
|-  style="background:#cfc;"
| 1993-10-02 || Win ||align=left| Wangthong Por.Pisitchet || Lumpinee Stadium || Bangkok, Thailand || KO (Right Cross) || 3 ||
|-
! style=background:white colspan=9 |
|-  style="background:#cfc;"
| 1993-08-31 || Win ||align=left| Pichai Wor.Walapon || Lumpinee Stadium || Bangkok, Thailand || Decision || 5 || 3:00

|-  style="background:#cfc;"
| 1993-07-27 || Win ||align=left| Rattanachai Wor.Warapol || Lumpinee Stadium || Bangkok, Thailand || Decision || 5 || 3:00
|-  style="background:#fbb;"
| 1993-07-09 || Loss||align=left|  Wangthong Por.Pisitchet || Lumpinee Stadium || Bangkok, Thailand || Decision || 5 || 3:00
|-
! style=background:white colspan=9 |
|-  style="background:#cfc;"
| 1993-04-06 || Win ||align=left| Nongnarong Luksamrong || Lumpinee Stadium || Bangkok, Thailand || Decision || 5 || 3:00
|-  style="background:#cfc;"
| 1993-01-02 || Win ||align=left| Fahsang Por.Pongsawang || Lumpinee Stadium || Bangkok, Thailand || Decision || 5 || 3:00

|-  style="background:#cfc;"
| 1992-1993 || Win ||align=left| Singhao Tor.Hiamto || Lumpinee Stadium || Bangkok, Thailand || Decision || 5 || 3:00

|-  style="background:#fbb;"
| 1992-1993 || Loss ||align=left| Rittidet Sor.Ploenchit || Lumpinee Stadium || Bangkok, Thailand || Decision || 5 || 3:00

|-  style="background:#cfc;"
| 1992-09-11 || Win ||align=left| Rattanachai Wor.Warapol || Lumpinee Stadium || Bangkok, Thailand || TKO (Elbows) || 5 ||

|-  style="background:#fbb;"
| 1992- || Loss ||align=left| Tukatatong Por.Pongsawang || Lumpinee Stadium || Bangkok, Thailand || Decision || 5 || 3:00

|-  style="background:#cfc;"
| 1992-02-07 || Win ||align=left| Khanungpetch Jonygym || Lumpinee Stadium || Bangkok, Thailand || Decision || 5 || 3:00
|-  style="background:#fbb;"
| 1991 || Loss ||align=left| Tukatatong Por.Pongsawang || Lumpinee Stadium || Bangkok, Thailand || Decision || 5 || 3:00
|-  style="background:#fbb;"
| 1991 || Loss ||align=left| Pompetch Kiatchatpayak || Lumpinee Stadium || Bangkok, Thailand || Decision || 5 || 3:00
|-  style="background:#fbb;"
| 1991 || Loss ||align=left| Chainoi Muangsurin || Lumpinee Stadium || Bangkok, Thailand || Decision || 5 || 3:00
|-  style="background:#cfc;"
| 1991 || Win ||align=left| Chainoi Muangsurin || Lumpinee Stadium || Bangkok, Thailand || Decision || 5 || 3:00
|-  style="background:#fbb;"
| 1991-08-28 || Loss ||align=left| Samuangnoi Lukjaophomahesak || Rajadamnern Stadium || Bangkok, Thailand || Decision || 5 || 3:00
|-  style="background:#cfc;"
| 1991 || Win ||align=left| Toto Por Pongsawang || Lumpinee Stadium || Bangkok, Thailand || Decision || 5 || 3:00
|-  style="background:#cfc;"
| 1991-07-01 || Win ||align=left| Morakot Sor.Thammarangsi || Lumpinee Stadium || Bangkok, Thailand || Decision || 5 || 3:00
|-
! style=background:white colspan=9 |
|-  style="background:#fbb;"
| 1991-04-30 || Loss ||align=left| Toto Por Pongsawang || Lumpinee Stadium || Bangkok, Thailand || Decision || 5 || 3:00
|-  style="background:#cfc;"
| 1991-03-25 || Win ||align=left| Pairojnoi Sor Siamchai || Lumpinee Stadium || Bangkok, Thailand || Decision || 5 || 3:00
|-  style="background:#cfc;"
| 1991-03-01 || Win ||align=left| Kompayak Singmanee || Lumpinee Stadium || Bangkok, Thailand || Decision || 5 || 3:00
|-  style="background:#fbb;"
| 1991- || Loss ||align=left| Toto Por Pongsawang || Lumpinee Stadium || Bangkok, Thailand || Decision || 5 || 3:00
|-  style="background:#cfc;"
| 1991-01-20 || Win ||align=left| Lamnamoon Sor.Sumalee || Rajadamnern Stadium || Bangkok, Thailand || Decision || 5 || 3:00
|-  style="background:#cfc;"
| 1990- || Win ||align=left| Sornsuk Keatwichean|| Rajadamnern Stadium || Bangkok, Thailand || Decision || 5 || 3:00
|-  style="background:#cfc;"
| 1990- || Win ||align=left| Meethanoi Maliwan || Lumpinee Stadium || Bangkok, Thailand || Decision || 5 || 3:00
|-  style="background:#cfc;"
| 1990- || Win||align=left| Hansulek Singkhonpan|| Lumpinee Stadium || Bangkok, Thailand || Decision || 5 || 3:00
|-  style="background:#cfc;"
| 1990- || Win||align=left| Hansulek Singkhonpan|| Lumpinee Stadium || Bangkok, Thailand || Decision || 5 || 3:00
|-  style="background:#cfc;"
| 1990- || Win||align=left| Khanuphet Jonnygym|| Lumpinee Stadium || Bangkok, Thailand || Decision || 5 || 3:00
|-  style="background:#cfc;"
| 1990-08-21 || Win ||align=left| Nungubon Sitlerchai || Lumpinee Stadium || Bangkok, Thailand || Decision || 5 || 3:00
|-
! style=background:white colspan=9 |
|-  style="background:#cfc;"
| 1990- || Win||align=left| Takrawlek Dejrath || Lumpinee Stadium || Bangkok, Thailand || Decision || 5 || 3:00
|-  style="background:#cfc;"
| 1990- || Win||align=left| Chainoi Sitchunthong || Lumpinee Stadium || Bangkok, Thailand || Decision || 5 || 3:00
|-  style="background:#cfc;"
| 1990- || Win||align=left| Takrawlek Dejrath || Lumpinee Stadium || Bangkok, Thailand || Decision || 5 || 3:00
|-  style="background:#fbb;"
| 1990- || Loss ||align=left| Meethanoi Maliwan || Lumpinee Stadium || Bangkok, Thailand || Decision || 5 || 3:00
|-  style="background:#cfc;"
| 1990- || Win||align=left| Chainoi Sitchunthong || Lumpinee Stadium || Bangkok, Thailand || Decision || 5 || 3:00
|-  style="background:#fbb;"
| 1990- || Loss||align=left| Chainoi Sitchunthong || Lumpinee Stadium || Bangkok, Thailand || Decision || 5 || 3:00
|-  style="background:#cfc;"
| 1990- || Win ||align=left| Chandet Sor.Prantalay || Lumpinee Stadium || Bangkok, Thailand || Decision || 5 || 3:00
|-  style="background:#cfc;"
| 1990-04-24 || Win ||align=left| Nungubon Sitlerchai || Lumpinee Stadium || Bangkok, Thailand || Decision || 5 || 3:00
|-  style="background:#cfc;"
| 1990- || Win ||align=left| Sinchai Saksamut|| Rajadamnern Stadium || Bangkok, Thailand || Decision || 5 || 3:00
|-  style="background:#cfc;"
| 1990- || Win ||align=left| Rungrat Srisunchai || Lumpinee Stadium || Bangkok, Thailand || Decision || 5 || 3:00
|-  style="background:#cfc;"
| 1990- || Win ||align=left| Kwanla Bangprachan|| Lumpinee Stadium || Bangkok, Thailand || Decision || 5 || 3:00
|-  style="background:#cfc;"
| 1990- || Win||align=left| Meethanoi Maliwan || Lumpinee Stadium || Bangkok, Thailand || Decision || 5 || 3:00
|-  style="background:#fbb;"
| 1990-01-20 || Loss||align=left| Nungubon Sitlerchai || Lumpinee Stadium || Bangkok, Thailand || Decision || 5 || 3:00

|-  style="background:#cfc;"
| 1989-08-18 || Win||align=left| Naewrob Por.Muang Ubon || Lumpinee Stadium || Bangkok, Thailand || Decision || 5 || 3:00

|-  style="background:#fbb;"
| 1987-10-13 || Loss||align=left| Noenthong Singkhiri || Lumpinee Stadium || Bangkok, Thailand || Decision || 5 || 3:00
|-
! style=background:white colspan=9 |
|-
| colspan=9 | Legend''':

References

Thongchai Tor.Silachai
Living people
1971 births
Thongchai Tor.Silachai
Flyweight kickboxers